The Maricopa County Board of Supervisors is the governing body of Maricopa County, a county of over four million in Arizona. The five supervisors are each elected from single-member districts to serve four-year terms. Primary elections and general elections take place in years divisible by four. Vacancies are filled by appointment by remaining members of the board; a member of the same party of the departing member must be selected.

The Board usually meets two Wednesdays every month in the Supervisor's Auditorium at the Maricopa County Complex in Phoenix, Arizona.  Members of the public are invited to attend these meetings.

, Bill Gates is the board's chairman.

Current members

Past members 
2000 Elections:

2004 Elections:

2008 Elections:

2012 Elections:

Departments 

Maricopa County Attorney's Office
Maricopa County Recorder
 Maricopa County Sheriff's Office
 Maricopa County Courthouse
 Maricopa County Library District

History
Maricopa County was officially established on February 17, 1871,  the first of the original four counties in Territorial Arizona. The County is named after the Maricopa Indians, who were known to have inhabited the area as early as 1775. Maricopa County's outer geographical boundaries have not changed since they were first set in 1871.

The Arizona Territory was created in 1862, and the initial counties were Yavapai, Pima, Yuma and Pah-Ute Counties.  

Maricopa County was created in 1871 out of Yavapai County.

Mission
The mission of Maricopa County is to provide regional leadership and fiscally responsible, necessary public services so that residents can enjoy living in a healthy and safe community. Maricopa County was officially established on February 14, 1871.

See also
Board of supervisors
Maricopa County

References

External links
 County Website

Maricopa County, Arizona